Xiaohongshu is a social media and e-commerce platform.  It has been described as "China's answer to Instagram".

, Xiaohongshu had over 300 million registered users and the number of monthly active users is over 85 million. 70% of its users are reportedly born after 1990, and nearly 90% of them are females. The app allows users and influencers to post, discover and share product reviews, most frequently related to beauty and health. Travel bloggers are also known to regularly post content regarding tourism and leisure destinations on the platform. Xiaohongshu also operates RED Mall, which sells international products to Chinese users.

Xiaohongshu's headquarters are in Huangpu District, Shanghai.

History 
Xiaohongshu was founded by Miranda Qu and Charlwin Mao in 2013, as an online tour guide for Chinese shoppers, providing a platform for users to review products and to share their shopping experiences with the community. In October 2014, the founders started focusing on connecting Chinese consumers with global retailers and established its own cross-border e-commerce platform, where Chinese consumers can buy products from overseas and order directly.

In 2015, Xiaohongshu set up its warehouses in Shenzhen, Guangdong and Zhengzhou, Henan.

By May 2017 Xiaohongshu had over 50 million users, with sales of nearly ¥10 billion, making it one of the world's largest community e-commerce platforms. Xiaohongshu's international logistics system REDelivery went into service during the month. On 6 June that year, Xiaohongshu held a shopping festival to celebrate its fourth anniversary, which sees the sales revenue exceeded CN¥ 100 million in 2 hours, while the app ranked in first place in the iOS App Store under "Shopping" category during that day.

In June 2018, Xiaohongshu completed a US$300 million funding led by Alibaba and Tencent, with a valuation of US$3 billion.

Due to the platform's early focus on fashion and beauty trends, Xiaohongshu’s user base is predominantly female in its early years. 90% of Xiaohongshu users were women, according to a report published in April 2021. The app had attracted affluent Gen Z female users in urban China as an alternative to Instagram, which is blocked in the country. Xiaohongshu subsequently adjusted its corporate strategy to attract more male users to maintain its growth. In 2021, it announced that the platform would promote male user content. Xiaohongshu also started increasing advertising in male-centric online spaces, such as the Hupu sports forum with advertising taglines, “Beautiful ladies are all here on Xiaohongshu, free to see, without spending any money!”, ⁣ while another Xiaohongshu ad shown on forum site Baidu Tieba read, “Sexy, beautiful car models and stylish beauties are waiting for you.”

In October 2021. Xiaohongshu decided to transfer the IPO from the United States to Hong Kong. According to a Bloomberg report in July, this includes requiring all companies holding more than 1 million user data to submit a cyber security review, which is one of the reasons for the suspension of Xiaohongshu's listing in the United States.

As of March 15, 2022, Xiaohongshu has launched the algorithm close button, allowing users to turn off "personalized recommendation" in the background with one click.

At the end of the 2019, Xiaohongshu began to test the live streaming platform, and will officially launch live streaming with commerce in January 2021.

Controversy 
In October 2021, Xiaohongshu received criticism for condoning heavily filtered, stylized photographs and perfectly captured imagery that was becoming increasingly common on the platform's feeds. On 17 October 2021, the platform issued a statement on WeChat to acknowledge that there was a problem of travel influencers posting “overly beautified” photos of scenic spots. According to the statement, Xiaohongshu issued an apology and indicated that because "bloggers did not clearly label their works as creative photography, people interpreted them as part of travel guides. Users who visited the locations were disappointed by the differences between their expectations and reality".

In December 2021, in response to loss of public trust towards the authenticity of content hosted on its platform, Xiaohongshu formed a dedicated team to identify and remove fraudulent content. A system that uses algorithms and human checks to block falsified content was also implemented. Since then, the platform has banned 81 brands and merchants, deleted 172,600 fake reviews, and disabled 53,600 accounts, according to the company.

On 19 January 2022, an announcement was made by Xiaohongshu to indicate that the company has filed a lawsuit against four companies behind several ghostwriting broker sites in an attempt to restore consumer trust. In an official statement made by Xiaohongshu, the company alleged that the four companies had set up marketplaces for merchants and gig writers to carry out fraudulent practices, including the production of fake reviews and click farming. Xiaohongshu has asked for US$1.57 million in damages for a bruise to its reputation and the infringement of consumer rights on its platform.

On 25 January 2022, reports emerged that Xiaohongshu has received a fine totaling ¥300,000 from local authorities in Shanghai for failing to remove content that was deemed harmful to minors. The fine relates to a violation of cybersecurity law that guarantees protection for minors after an earlier media report was made by state broadcaster China Central Television (CCTV) in December 2021, that it found videos posted on Xiaohongshu showing underage girls in various states of undress, featured in advertisements for underwear brands.

References

External links
 

2013 establishments in China
Companies based in Shanghai
Online marketplaces of China